Albion may refer to the following places in the U.S. state of New York:

 Albion (town), Orleans County, New York
 Albion (village), New York, most of which is in the town above
 Albion, Oswego County, New York, a town

See also
 New Albion, New York